Françoise Decharne (born 20 May 1963) is a French sports shooter. She competed in the women's 10 metre air rifle event at the 1984 Summer Olympics.

References

1963 births
Living people
French female sport shooters
Olympic shooters of France
Shooters at the 1984 Summer Olympics
Place of birth missing (living people)